Stjernen Hockey is a Norwegian ice hockey team based in Fredrikstad, Norway. They currently play in the GET-ligaen. They play their home games in Stjernehallen. Their team colours are red and white.

History
Stjernen was founded in 1960 when the boys club "the Star" simply translated their name to Norwegian to comply with the rules of the association to begin play in the league system. After ten years of playing on an outdoor rink, or hiring ice time from local rivals Sparta Warriors, Stjernen got their own arena in 1970 when Stjernehallen was officially opened.

With a good youth organisation to go with the new facilities, Stjernen soon started to climb in the leagues and in 1974 they reached the first division for the first time in club history.

In 1981, the club saw its finest day beating Vålerenga Ishockey 2–1 in the best of three play-off final becoming the first team outside Oslo to hoist the cup. Upon returning to Fredrikstad they were met by a crowd of several thousand people carrying torches, cheering the newly crowned champions.

With star players in the shape of Ørjan Løvdal, Rune Gulliksen, Hans Edlund, Pål Gjermundsen and later even Morten Finstad and colourful Canadian forward Chris St.Cyr Stjernen was the team to beat throughout the 1980s. Championship success however was repeated only once. In 1986 outsiders Frisk were well beaten in the final.

Although Stjernen remained a force well into the 1990s they never managed to add to their two titles. Playing two more finals in 1992 and 1995 they failed both times to add to the silverware.

During the late 1990s, the club fell into recession due to economic difficulties and failings in the youth department. Having nearly been bankrupted on a couple of occasions the club has started rebuilding and came back into the top during the 05-06-season when they finished second in the league and was extremely close to making the play-off final. The team largely built around foreign talent however disintegrated after the season, and the new crop of players did not hold the same standard, leaving the club to fight for a place in this year's play-off.

Season-by-season results
This is a partial list of the last five seasons completed by Stjernen. For the full season-by-season history, see List of Stjernen Hockey seasons.
{| class="wikitable"
|bgcolor="#D0E7FF"|<small>Norwegian Champions</small>
|bgcolor="#FFE6BD"|Regular Season Champions
|bgcolor="#ddffdd"|Promoted
|bgcolor="#FFCCCC"|Relegated
|}

*Code explanation; GP—Games Played, W—Wins, L—Losses, OTW—Overtime/Shootout wins, OTL—Overtime/Shootout losses, GF—Goals For, GA—Goals Against, Pts'''—Points

Players and personnel

Retired numbers

Notable players
 Henrik Höglund
 Pål Grotnes
 Linus Kjell
 Mats Knutsen
 Johan Olsson

References

External links
 Official website
 Official forum

 
Ice hockey clubs established in 1960
Ice hockey teams in Norway
Sport in Fredrikstad
1960 establishments in Norway
GET-ligaen teams